Champguyon is a commune in the Marne department, Grand Est region, in north-eastern France. The commune has an area of 16.63 km2 and its altitude ranges from 159 to 214 meters. The nearest larger towns are Esternay (4 km to the south) and Sézanne (14 km to the southeast). As of 2019, there were 146 dwellings in Champguyon, of which 109 main residences.

Population

See also
Communes of the Marne department

References

Communes of Marne (department)